After My Death is a 2017 South Korean mystery drama film written, directed and edited by Kim Ui-seok and stars Jeon Yeo-been, Seo Young-hwa and Go Won-hee.

Plot
When her missing classmate and close friend Kyung-min (Jeon So-nee) is suspected of committing suicide, Young-hee (Jeon Yeo-been) becomes the prime suspect because she was the last one seen with Kyung-min on the night of her disappearance. Young-hee faces accusations from Kyung-min's mother (Seo Young-hwa) as well as her quick-to-condemn classmates. She insists on her innocence and tries to find out the truth on her own. When the school and her family offer her no support with the bullying she is experiencing, she decides to commit suicide herself.

Cast
 Jeon Yeo-been as Young-hee
 Seo Young-hwa as Kyung-min's mother
 Go Won-hee as Han-sol
 Jeon So-nee as Kyung-min
 Lee Bom as Da-som

Awards and nominations

References

External links
 
 
 

2017 films
2010s mystery drama films
2010s Korean-language films
South Korean mystery drama films
2017 drama films
2010s South Korean films